Momoen is a village in the municipality of Aurskog-Høland, Norway. 
Its population (2005) is 349. Momoen is about 55 km from Oslo.

Villages in Akershus
Aurskog-Høland